Tom Goode may refer to:
 Tom Goode (American football) (1938–2015) American football player, coach, and administrator
 Tom Goode (politician) (1900–1983), Canadian politician

See also 
 Thomas Goode (disambiguation)
 Goode (name)